Joseph Amoako (born 13 September 2002) is a Ghanaian footballer who plays as a midfielder for Swedish club Helsingborgs IF. He previously played for Ghana Premier League side Asante Kotoko.

Career 
Amoako started his career with Central Region-based club Young Red Bull, a lower-tier side in Division Two League. In October 2021, Amoako joined Ghana Premier League giants Asante Kotoko on a three-year deal keeping him at the club until 2024.

In February 2022, he joined Helsingborgs IF on a one-year initial one-year loan deal with an option to make it permanent. On 14 February 2022, he played his first match for the club after coming on in the 78th minute in a friendly match against Danish side FC Nordsjaelland which ended in a 4–2 loss to Helsingborgs IF.

References

External links 

 
 

Living people
2002 births
Association football midfielders
Ghanaian footballers
Asante Kotoko S.C. players
Helsingborgs IF players
Allsvenskan players
Ghanaian expatriate footballers
Expatriate footballers in Sweden
Ghanaian expatriate sportspeople in Sweden